Rhéal is a masculine given name. Notable people with the name include:

Rhéal Bélisle (1919–1992), Canadian politician
Rhéal Cormier (1967–2021), Canadian baseball player
Rhéal Fortin, Canadian lawyer and politician

Masculine given names